Proterocladia is a genus of moths in the family Megalopygidae.

Species
Proterocladia roseata (Hopp, 1922)

References

Megalopygidae
Megalopygidae genera